Lockspot Cafe is a restaurant in Seattle's Ballard neighborhood, in the U.S. state of Washington. The restaurant has operated for 90 years, as of 2020. Alison Soike and Ryan Faniel purchased the restaurant from Pam Hanson in 2021. The cafe has been featured on the Discovery Channel series Deadliest Catch.

See also 

 List of restaurants in Seattle

References 

Ballard, Seattle
Restaurants in Seattle